The Lechtal Alps are a mountain-range in western Austria, and part of the greater Northern Limestone Alps range. Named for the river Lech which drains them north-ward into Germany, the Lechtal Alps occupy the Austrian states of Tyrol and Vorarlberg and are known for their diverse rock structure.

The Lechtal Alps are surrounded by the Ötztal Alps, Samnaun Alps and Verwall Alps (south) and the Allgäu Alps (north).

Peaks 
Parseierspitze, 
Dawinkopf, 
Südlicher Schwarzer Kopf, 
Gatschkopf, 
Bocksgartenspitze, 
Holzgauer Wetterspitze, 
Oberer Bocksgartenkopf, 
Vorderseespitze, 
Freispitze, 
Eisenspitze, 
Große Schlenkerspitze, 
Fallenbacherspitze,

External links

 
Mountain ranges of the Alps
Northern Limestone Alps
Mountain ranges of Tyrol (state)
Mountain ranges of Vorarlberg